Waves is an album by jazz saxophonist Charles Lloyd recorded in 1972 by Lloyd and featuring Gábor Szabó, Roger McGuinn and Mike Love.

Reception
The Allmusic review by Scott Yanow awarded the album 2 stars and states "This CD reissue is mostly forgettable, finding Lloyd on tenor and flute mostly playing relaxing and soothing solos... most of the music is quite faceless". 

Seattle’s Jive Time Records' Buckley Mayfield's review: "Waves is a testament to Lloyd’s aptitude for adaptability. He proved that a respected jazz musician could smoothly transition into the precarious freak zone of fusion and hippie rock and create a lasting work—even though too few people realize it.

Track listing
All compositions by Charles Lloyd except as indicated
 "TM" - 4:58  
 "Pyramid" (Tom Trujillo) - 7:08  
 "Majorca" - 6:10  
 "Harvest" - 8:57
 "Waves" - 5:17  
 "Rishikisha: Hummingbird" - 1:36  
 "Rishikisha: Rishikesh" (Charles Lloyd, Michael Love) - 1:24  
 "Rishikisha: Seagull" - 2:14 
Recorded at Malibu Road

Personnel
Charles Lloyd - tenor saxophone, flute, alto flute
Gábor Szabó (tracks 1, 3 & 4), Tom Trujillo (tracks 2, 5 & 6) guitar
Roger McGuinn - 12 string guitar (tracks 1 & 5) 
Wolfgang Melz - bass (tracks 1-5) 
Roberto Miranda - bass (tracks 2 & 5) 
Woodrow Theus II - drums, percussion (tracks 1-5)
Mayuto Correa - percussion (tracks 1, 3 & 4)  
Mike Love - vocals (tracks 1 & 7)
Al Jardine, Billy Hinsche, Carl Wilson, Pamela Polland - vocals (track 1)

Production
Eric Sherman, Joan Lloyd - assistant producers
Roland Young - art direction, photography
Chuck Beeson - design
Masami Teraoka - artwork, illustration

References

1972 albums
A&M Records albums
Charles Lloyd (jazz musician) albums